Techi Dam is a concrete thin arch dam on the Dajia River in Heping District, Taichung, Taiwan. Forming the  Techi Reservoir (德基水庫), the dam is built in the Tachien Gorge in Heping District, providing hydroelectric power, irrigation water, and some flood control, and is operated by the Taiwan Power Company. At , it is the highest dam in Taiwan and one of the tallest dams in the world. The dam was completed in 1974 after five years of construction.

History
Proposals to dam the Dajia River date back to the period of Japanese colonial rule in Taiwan (1895–1945), when dams were envisioned to generate 430 megawatts (MW) of power on the river. In 1936, the Taiwan Power Company began to survey and collect data at this site, but there would be a gap of more than ten years between Taiwan's 1945 independence from Japan and the beginning of development on the Dajia River. The downstream Tienlun and Kukuan dams were built in 1956 and 1961 respectively, but with their small storage capacities, power output was highly erratic. A high dam upstream would be required to control the flow through these downstream power stations.

The proposed Tachien Dam site was located at the end of a long valley where the surrounding mountains abruptly closed in to form a narrow slot canyon through which flowed the Dajia River. The dam would support a 360 MW power station and generate over 736 million kWh per year. Of the dam's projected US$110 million cost, the United States provided a loan of about US$40 million, while Japan would provide assistance with hydraulic gates and power-generating equipment.

Construction at Tachien Dam began in December 1969, with work directed and overseen by French civil engineers André Coyne and Jean Bellier. Due to the remote site, economic conditions and technical issues, it was a very difficult project for Taiwan at the time, but public support made continued construction possible. The reservoir began filling in June 1974, and the dam structure was completed in September 1974. At the dedication ceremony, Chiang Kai-shek officially named the dam "Techi", meaning "foundation of virtue". In 1975, the Republic of China issued a set of postage stamps to commemorate the completion of the project.

Specifications
Techi Dam is located at the head of a  watershed in the upper reaches of the Dajia River. This rugged topography makes the catchment extremely susceptible to floods and earthflows. Techi Dam greatly reduces the impact of these events along the lower Dajia River.

Outflows from the dam are controlled by three spillways. With all outlets open, the dam is capable of releasing .

The dam supplies water to an underground power station capable of generating 234 MW from three 78 MW generators, producing about 359 million kWh each year. The tailrace of the power plant discharges directly to the reservoir of the Qingshan Dam downstream. From here, water released from Techi flows through four more hydroelectric plants at Qingshan, Kukuan, Tienlun, and Ma'an dams, which collectively generate about 2.4 billion kWh per year.

See also

 List of power stations in Taiwan
 List of dams and reservoirs in Taiwan
 Electricity sector in Taiwan

References

Works cited

1974 establishments in Taiwan
Dams in Taichung
Dams completed in 1974
Hydroelectric power stations in Taiwan